Chehab may refer to:

 Fuad Chehab, President of Lebanon from 1958 to 1964
 Khaled Chehab, Prime Minister   of Lebanon 1938 and 1952 to 1953
 Zaki Chehab, journalist
 Chehab or Shehab (Dynasty), rulers of several parts of present-day Lebanon during the Ottoman Period